Shuhada is one of the 29 districts of Badakhshan province in eastern Afghanistan.  The district was formed in 2005 from part of Baharak District and is home to approximately 38,387 residents.

See also
Baharak district

References

External links
Map at the Afghanistan Information Management Services

Districts of Badakhshan Province